Maurice FitzGerald, 9th Duke of Leinster (born 7 April 1948), styled Earl of Offaly before 1976 and Marquess of Kildare between 1976 and 2004, is an Anglo-Irish nobleman and landscape designer.

The Duke is the highest-ranking member of the peerage of Ireland.

Family and education
The elder son of Gerald, 8th Duke of Leinster, and his second wife, Anne, daughter of Philip Smith, he was educated at Millfield School, Street, Somerset. Upon his father's death in 2004 he succeeded to the dukedom as the 9th Duke.

Marriage and children
Maurice FitzGerald, then styled Earl of Offaly, married Fiona Mary Francesca Hollick on 19 February 1972. The Duke and Duchess have had three children:
Thomas FitzGerald, Earl of Offaly (1974–1997); killed in a motor accident.
Lady Francesca Emily Purcell FitzGerald-Hobbs (born 6 July 1976), has two daughters, Amelia Grace Francesca and Daisy Emily Matilda by Stephen Thompstone (now separated) and one son, Rufus James Thomas by Mark Hobbs, whom she married on 25 October 2017.
Lady Pollyanna Louisa Clementine FitzGerald (born at John Radcliffe Hospital, Oxford, 9 May 1982); as yet unmarried.

Heir
The present Duke's only son died childless in 1997, thus his brother, Captain Lord John FitzGerald (1952–2015), became heir presumptive to the family titles; educated at Millfield and the Royal Military Academy Sandhurst, he served as a captain in the 5th Royal Inniskilling Dragoon Guards and later was a horse trainer by profession.

Lord John married Barbara Zindel, daughter of Andreas and Daniela Zindel, of Lausanne and St. Moritz, Switzerland, at St. Nicholas Church, Chadlington, Oxford, on 11 December 1982; they divorced in 2013 and Lord John died on 3 August 2015. Lord and Lady John FitzGerald had two children: 
 Hermione FitzGerald (born Newmarket, Suffolk, 11 October 1985)
 Edward FitzGerald (born Newmarket, Suffolk, 27 October 1988)
Edward FitzGerald is the current heir presumptive to the dukedom and other family titles.

Title dispute

A controversial claim by the supposed descendants of the 5th Duke (largely debunked by Michael Estorick in 1981) was made in 2006 and rejected in 2007 by the Lord Chancellor, who accepted the claim made by the 9th Duke of Leinster.

In 2010, however, DNA evidence was presented that indicates that Paul FitzGerald is related to the wife of the 5th Duke, the former Lady Hermione Duncombe. As reported in The Scotsman,
With the help of Dunfermline-based genealogist Lloyd Pitcairn, Mrs FitzGerald Caudill [Paul FitzGerald's aunt] traced Maud Crawford, the grand-daughter of Lady Hermione's younger sister Urica Duncombe.

The results of the tests found that it was "41 times more probable" that Ms Crawford and Paul FitzGerald were extremely closely related than were from different families. The proof that Paul FitzGerald is related to the titled family is the first DNA evidence ever produced in the case, and it strongly supports Mrs Fitz-Gerald Caudhill's long-held claim suggesting that her mysterious father was the son of Lady Hermione, the wife of the fifth Duke of Leinster.

References

External links
 
 Leinster Leader, Moving Maynooth visit by FitzGerald
 Hermione FitzGerald professional golf
 Maurice FitzGerald, 9th Duke of Leinster

1948 births
Living people
People educated at Millfield
Maurice
Dukes of Leinster (1766)